In mathematics, a LeBrun manifold is a connected sum of copies of the complex projective plane, equipped with an explicit self-dual metric. Here, self-dual means that the Weyl tensor  is its own Hodge star. The metric
is determined by the choice of a finite collection of points in hyperbolic 3-space.

References

Differential geometry